Bobigny cemetery is a Muslim-only burial ground near Paris in the town of Bobigny, Seine-Saint-Denis, France.

Lying just a few kilometers to the northeast of Paris, the town of Bobigny is home to one of only two Muslim cemeteries in France. It was created by the French government in 1937 on the site adjacent to the Franco-Muslim Hospital of Bobigny and hold about 7000 plots, for mainly North African people. It is a listed historical monument since 2006. It is not to be confused with the larger and multi-faith Cimetière parisien de Pantin nearby

Notable interments
 Peyveste Hanım – wife of Sultan of the Ottoman Empire
 Şehsuvar Hanım – wife of Caliphate of the Ottoman Empire
 Osman Fuad – Ottoman prince
 Akbar agha Sheykhulislamov – exile Azerbaijani politician and cabinet minister
 Princess Niloufer – Ottoman princess
 Abdul Halim Khaddam – Syrian statesman

Gallery

References

External links
 

Cemeteries in Île-de-France
Buildings and structures in Seine-Saint-Denis
Tourist attractions in Seine-Saint-Denis